Antonio "Toni" Soldevilla Castellsagué (born 19 December 1978) is a Spanish former footballer who played as a defender.

He amassed La Liga totals of 116 games and three goals, all with Espanyol. He added 122 matches and five goals in Segunda División B where he represented a host of clubs, and also competed professionally in Russia and Indonesia.

Club career
Soldevilla was born in L'Hospitalet de Llobregat, Barcelona, Catalonia. Brought through the ranks of RCD Espanyol, he made his first-team debut on 19 February 1997 in a 0–2 La Liga home loss against Athletic Bilbao, being sent off in the game; he would make 133 official appearances for the club with four goals, eventually becoming first-choice while partnering fellow youth graduate Alberto Lopo in the centre and also going on to captain the squad.

However, Soldevilla grew unsettled and left it in 2005, citing personal reasons – he had already spent several months away from the game during the 2003–04 season. He signed for second division side Polideportivo Ejido midway through 2005–06, where he played only a handful of matches.

After an unsuccessful trial with Ipswich Town and starting off 2006–07 in Cyprus with Apollon Limassol, Soldevilla became the first Spanish player in the Russian Premier League, signing for FC Amkar Perm for the start of the 2007 season. He was released in early March 2008.

In mid-December 2009, Soldevilla signed with UD Marbella in the third level following a one-month trial. He split the following season also in that tier, totalling 20 appearances with Caravaca CF and Ontinyent CF combined.

Honours
Espanyol
Copa del Rey: 1999–2000

References

External links

1978 births
Living people
Footballers from L'Hospitalet de Llobregat
Spanish footballers
Association football defenders
La Liga players
Segunda División players
Segunda División B players
Tercera División players
RCD Espanyol B footballers
CE L'Hospitalet players
RCD Espanyol footballers
Polideportivo Ejido footballers
Marbella FC players
Caravaca CF players
Ontinyent CF players
CD Alcoyano footballers
CD Eldense footballers
Apollon Limassol FC players
Russian Premier League players
FC Amkar Perm players
Indonesian Premier Division players
Pro Duta FC players
Spain youth international footballers
Spain under-21 international footballers
Catalonia international footballers
Spanish expatriate footballers
Expatriate footballers in Cyprus
Expatriate footballers in Russia
Expatriate footballers in Indonesia
Spanish expatriate sportspeople in Cyprus
Spanish expatriate sportspeople in Russia
Spanish expatriate sportspeople in Indonesia